Miguel Ángel Sebastián Romero (born 14 December 1979 in Florida, Buenos Aires) is a retired Argentine footballer.

Career
Romero started his career in 2000 with Chacarita Juniors, in 2003 he signed a contract with Spanish side Real Sociedad, but never played for the club. Instead, he spent one season with Eibar and returned to Argentina on successive loan deals.

Romero returned to Argentina in 2004 where he has played single seasons for Gimnasia y Esgrima de La Plata, Banfield and Racing Club before joining  Colón de Santa Fe in 2007.

References

External links
 
 
 Statistics at BDFA 

1979 births
Living people
Sportspeople from Buenos Aires Province
Argentine footballers
Argentine expatriate footballers
SD Eibar footballers
Club Atlético Banfield footballers
Club Atlético Colón footballers
Chacarita Juniors footballers
Club de Gimnasia y Esgrima La Plata footballers
Racing Club de Avellaneda footballers
Independiente Rivadavia footballers
C.D. Jorge Wilstermann players
Club Almirante Brown footballers
Argentine Primera División players
Segunda División players
Argentine expatriate sportspeople in Spain
Argentine expatriate sportspeople in Bolivia
Expatriate footballers in Spain
Expatriate footballers in Bolivia
Association football midfielders